Genius Factor Games was a Canadian independent video game developer based in North Vancouver, BC, Canada. It developed independent ("indie") games for Apple iOS, Android and mobile platforms via direct-download distribution.

The company was founded in 2008 by Ted Nugent, a former employee of EA Canada. Its first game, released in April 2009, was Gravity Well, described as a cross between pinball and mini-golf. In November 2011, to coincide with CPR Month, Genius Factor Games created an app called Heart Hero for the Heart and Stroke Foundation of Canada. The app allows users to practice CPR to the beat of the Bee Gee's Stayin' Alive.

Games

References

Video game development companies
Defunct video game companies of Canada
Privately held companies of Canada
Video game companies established in 2008
2008 establishments in British Columbia
Video game companies disestablished in 2013
2013 disestablishments in British Columbia